Juan de Dicastillo (28 December 1584 – 6 March 1653) was a Spanish Jesuit theologian. He was born in Naples. He entered the novitiate of the Society of Jesus in 1600, and was professor of theology for twenty-five years at Toledo, Murcia, and Vienna. He died in Ingolstadt.

Works

In moral theology, Dicastillo followed the principles of probabilism. His principal works are: 

"De justitia et jure ceterisque virtutibus cardinalibus libriduo" (Antwerp, 1641); 
"De Sacramentis in genere disputationes scholastic et morales" (Antwerp, 1646–52); 
"Tractatus duo de juramento, perjurio, et adjuratione, necnon de censuris et poenis ecclesiasticis" (Antwerp, 1662);
"Tractatus de incarnatione" (Antwerp, 1642).

References

Attribution
 The entry cites:
Hugo von Hurter, Nomenclator; 
Sommervogel, Bibliothèque de la c. de J.,III, col. 49; 
Langhorst in Kirchenlexikon, s.v.

1584 births
1653 deaths
16th-century Neapolitan people
17th-century Spanish Jesuits
17th-century Spanish Roman Catholic theologians
Academic staff of the University of Murcia
Academic staff of the University of Vienna